Under the American Flag is a World War I song written by Andrew B. Sterling and composed by Harry Von Tilzer. The song was first published in 1915 by Harry Von Tilzer Publishing Co. in New York, NY. The sheet music cover features a man hugging a woman with an inset photo of Harry Von Tilzer.
 
The sheet music can be found at the Pritzker Military Museum & Library.

References 

Bibliography
Parker, Bernard S. World War I Sheet Music 1. Jefferson: McFarland & Company, Inc., 2007. . 
Vogel, Frederick G. World War I Songs: A History and Dictionary of Popular American Patriotic Tunes, with Over 300 Complete Lyrics. Jefferson: McFarland & Company, Inc., 1995. . 

1915 songs
Songs of World War I
Songs with lyrics by Andrew B. Sterling
Songs with music by Harry Von Tilzer